The house at 1254–1256 Montgomery Street is a historic house located in the Telegraph Hill neighborhood of San Francisco. Construction commenced in the early 1860s [partial first floor] and sits on a secondary summit of the hill, which was also the site of a windmill that burned in 1861. The house's Italianate architecture design features large windows on the front corner, double-hung sash windows decorated with pilasters and cornices, and a bracketed cornice along the roofline. While the house originally had only one story, its second story was part of its original plan and constructed by the 1890s. The house is one of the few buildings on Telegraph Hill which survived the 1906 San Francisco earthquake and its aftermath.

The house was added to the National Register of Historic Places on January 31, 1979.

References

Italianate architecture in California
Houses completed in 1865
National Register of Historic Places in San Francisco
Houses in San Francisco
Houses on the National Register of Historic Places in San Francisco